In mathematics, an Igusa zeta function is a type of generating function, counting the number of solutions of an equation, modulo p, p2, p3, and so on.

Definition 

For a prime number p let K be a p-adic field, i.e. , R the valuation ring and P the maximal ideal.

In this situation one associates to a non-constant polynomial  the Igusa zeta function

 

where  and dx is Haar measure so normalized that  has measure 1.

Igusa's theorem 
The proof uses Heisuke Hironaka's theorem about the resolution of singularities. Later, an entirely different proof was given by Jan Denef using p-adic cell decomposition. Little is known, however, about explicit formulas. (There are some results about Igusa zeta functions of Fermat varieties.)

Congruences modulo powers of  
Let  denote the number of solutions of the congruence

.

Then the Igusa zeta function

 

is closely related to the Poincaré series

 

by

References

Information for this article was taken from J. Denef, Report on Igusa's Local Zeta Function, Séminaire Bourbaki 43 (1990-1991), exp. 741; Astérisque 201-202-203 (1991), 359-386

Zeta and L-functions
Diophantine geometry